Maria Perosino (10 December 1961 – 16 June 2014) was an Italian author and art historian.

Born in Turin, Perosino graduated in art history at the University of Turin. She was curator of several exhibitions and cultural events, and  responsible for the implementation of the many exhibition catalogues. Her 2012 book, Io viaggio sola (I Travel Alone), a semi-serious spiritual and practical guide for women who want to travel alone, got a critical and commercial success and in 2013 it was adapted into a film, A Five Star Life, directed by Maria Sole Tognazzi. She died of tumor the day before the release of her last novel,  Le scelte che non hai fatto.

Selected publications 
     Maria Perosino, Renoir, Electa, 1992, . 
     Maria Perosino, Toulouse-Lautrec, Electa, 1997, .
     Paolo Fossati and Maria Perosino, Renata Boero, Essegi, 1997, . 
     Maria Perosino, Silvana Sermisoni and Sandra Solimano (cured by), Acqua, aria, terra, fuoco: i quattro elementi: l'energia della natura tra arte e scienza, Skira, 2005, . 
     Maria Perosino (cured by), Effetto terra, Johan & Levi, 2010, .
     Maria Perosino (cured by), Abc e altri giochi di Bruno Munari, Felici, 2010, .
     Lorenzo Mattotti and Maria Perosino (cured by), La fabbrica di Pinocchio, Nuages, 2010, . 
     Maria Perosino, Io viaggio da sola, Einaudi, 2012, .
     Maria Perosino, Le scelte che non hai fatto, Einaudi, 2014, .

References 

1961 births
Writers from Turin
2014 deaths
Italian art historians
Italian art curators
Women art historians
20th-century Italian novelists
21st-century Italian novelists
20th-century Italian women writers
21st-century Italian women writers